Ramaswami Ramanathan Chettiar (30 September 1913 – 12 December 1995) was an Indian businessman, politician and bureaucrat who served as member of Lok Sabha, the lower house of the Parliament of India and Mayor of Madras.

Early life 

Ramanathan Chettiar was born to philanthropist Diwan Bahadur Ramaswami Chettiar on 30 September 1913. Ramaswami Chettiar was the elder brother of Annamalai Chettiar.

Politics 

Ramanathan Chettiar was a member of the Indian National Congress and played an active role in the Indian Independence Movement. He served as a councillor in the Corporation of Madras from 1948 to 1952. In 1949 he was selected Sheriff of Madras and in 1950 was elected Mayor of Madras, serving in both cases for a year. 

In the 1957 Lok Sabha elections, Ramanathan Chettiar was elected to the Indian parliament from the Pudukkottai Lok Sabha constituency. He was again elected for the period 1962–1967, this time from the Karur constituency.

Bureaucracy 

Ramanathan Chettiar was the first director of the Reserve Bank of India. He also served as a member of the executive committee of the Federation of Indian Chambers of Commerce and as chairman of the Indian Handicrafts Development Corporation.

Death 

Ramanatha Chettiar died on 12 December 1995 at the age of 82. The Mayor Ramanathan Hall in Raja Annamalaipuram, Chennai, is named after him.

Notes 

1913 births
1995 deaths
Sheriffs of Madras
Mayors of Chennai
India MPs 1957–1962
India MPs 1962–1967
Lok Sabha members from Tamil Nadu
People from Karur district
People from Pudukkottai district